Gonzalo Balbi Lorenzo (born 5 June 1992) is a Uruguayan former footballer.

Career
Born in Montevideo, Uruguay, Balbi moved to Barcelona when he was just 11. He started his footballing career with local Spanish sides UE Sant Ildefons and Fundación Ferrán Martorell, before joining UE Cornellà. He participated in 'The Chance', organised by the Nike Academy and finished the competition as one of the 2012 winners. He joined Terrassa in 2012, and later the same year, switched to CE Júpiter. While at Júpiter, he was called up for Catalonia amateur team to play in the 2013 UEFA Regions' Cup, in which Catalonia finished runners up.

Balbi joined Icelandic side KR Reykjavík in 2014 and played for them in qualification for the 2014–15 UEFA Champions League against Scottish side Celtic.

Personal life
Balbi is the younger brother of Sofia Balbi, born in 1990, who is the wife of fellow Uruguayan footballer Luis Suárez. He's the uncle of Suarez's children's Delfina, Benjamin and Lautaro.

Career statistics

Club

Notes

References

1992 births
Living people
Footballers from Montevideo
Uruguayan footballers
Uruguayan expatriate footballers
Nike Academy players
Tercera División players
Úrvalsdeild karla (football) players
UE Cornellà players
Knattspyrnufélag Reykjavíkur players
Association football defenders
Uruguayan expatriate sportspeople in Spain
Expatriate footballers in Spain
Uruguayan expatriate sportspeople in Iceland
Expatriate footballers in Iceland